Dorothy Quincy Thomas (born 1960) is an American human rights activist. She was a 1998 MacArthur Fellow, and a 1995 Fellow of the Radcliffe Institute for Advanced Study.

Life
She graduated from Georgetown University with an M.A. in 1984. She is senior program advisor to the US Human Rights Fund. She was founding director of the Human Rights Watch, Women's Rights Division, from 1990 to 1998. She was a visiting fellow at the London School of Economics, from 2007 to 2008. She is a research associate at the School of Oriental and African Studies at the University of London. She is a director of the Ms. Foundation for Women.

Works
"Rape as a War Crime", SAIS Review, Johns Hopkins University Press
"Domestic Violence as a Human Rights Issue", Human Rights Quarterly, Vol. 15, No. 1 (Feb. 1993)

References

External links
Speaker Explores Human Rights as Issue for the U.S.
Dorothy Q. Thomas delivers the 18th Raymond & Beverly Sackler Lecture
Dorothy Q. Thomas – ‘Daughters of the American Revolution: Progressivism, Feminism and Human Rights in the U.S.’

1960 births
American human rights activists
Women human rights activists
MacArthur Fellows
Living people
Georgetown University alumni
Human Rights Watch people
Academics of SOAS University of London
Academics of the London School of Economics
Radcliffe fellows